Ballycastle may refer to:

Ballycastle, County Antrim, a small town in Northern Ireland
Ballycastle, County Mayo, a village in the Republic of Ireland
Ballycastle Castle